The 1997 British Open Championships was held at the Welsh Institute of Sport with the later stages being held at the Wales National Ice Rink in Cardiff from 31 March - 6 April 1997. Jansher Khan won his sixth consecutive title defeating Peter Nicol in the final. 
Paul Gregory represented Greece from 1997.

Draw and results

Seeds

Main draw

References

Men's British Open Squash Championships
Men's British Open
Men's British Open Squash Championship
Men's British Open Squash Championship
Men's British Open Squash Championship
Men's British Open Squash Championship
1990s in Cardiff
Sports competitions in Cardiff